The Beautiful Otero (French: La belle Otero, Italian: La bella Otero) is a 1954 French-Italian historical drama film directed by Richard Pottier and starring María Félix, Jacques Berthier and Louis Seigner. It is based on the story of the nineteenth century Spanish dancer and courtesan Caroline Otéro.

The film's sets were designed by the art director Robert Gys. Filming took place at the Joinville Studios and Saint-Maurice Studios in Paris. It was shot in Eastmancolor.

Cast
 María Félix as Caroline Otéro 
 Jacques Berthier as Jean Chastaing 
 Louis Seigner as L'imprésario Robert Martel 
 Marie Sabouret as Diane de Nemours 
 Paolo Stoppa as Frédéric 
 Jean-Marc Tennberg as Morillon 
 Maurice Teynac as Mountfeller 
 Jean Pâqui as D'Herbecourt 
 Micheline Gary as Eglantine 
 Nerio Bernardi as Le grand-duc 
 José Torres as Pablo 
 Alain Bouvette as Un spectateur au Kursaal 
 Gisèle Grandpré as La présentatrice 
 Jacqueline Marbaux as Lucie

References

Bibliography 
 Tom Brown & Belén Vidal. The Biopic in Contemporary Film Culture. Routledge, 2013.

External links 
 

1954 films
French historical drama films
Italian historical drama films
1950s historical drama films
1950s French-language films
Films directed by Richard Pottier
Films set in the 19th century
1954 drama films
1950s French films
1950s Italian films